Postal is a 2007 action comedy film co-written and directed by Uwe Boll, and starring Zack Ward, Dave Foley, Chris Coppola, Jackie Tohn, J.K. Simmons, Verne Troyer, Larry Thomas, David Huddleston and Seymour Cassel.

Like the majority of Boll's previous films, Postal is a film adaptation of a video game, in this case, Postal, though this film draws more heavily from the video game's sequel, Postal 2. Also like Boll's predecessors, it was a critical and commercial failure, grossing less than 1% of its budget.

Plot
The film begins with a prologue, showing Asif and Nabi, a fictional portrayal of two of the Flight 11 hijackers during the 9/11 attacks, debating the number of virgins they get as a reward for carrying out the attacks. After a long debate, they decide to call Osama bin Laden, their leader, to find out the exact amount. Osama tells them that there "are not enough virgins to go around", and upon hearing this, the two hijackers abandon the attack in dismay and happily change their flight path to the Bahamas. At this moment, however, the passengers of the plane storm the cockpit and attempt to retake the plane (this was based on what happened on Flight 93, one of the other hijacked aircraft during 9/11). In the struggle, the terrorists try and reason with the passengers, but to no avail, and ultimately, the plane inadvertently flies into the North tower of the World Trade Center.

Five years later, in the town of Paradise, Arizona (a ghost town in real life), where the volatile Postal Dude, after being mocked at a job interview, kicked out of his local unemployment office and discovering that his morbidly obese wife is cheating on him with various and skinny townsmen, is more than a little angry and is desperate to get enough cash to finally leave his dead-end town. He decides to team up with his Uncle Dave, a slovenly con artist turned doomsday cult leader who owes the US government over a million dollars in back-taxes. With the help of Uncle Dave's right-hand man Richie and an army of big-breasted, scantily clad cult members, the Dude devises a plan to hijack a shipment of 2,000 Krotchy Dolls, a rare, sought-after plush toy resembling a giant scrotum. Uncle Dave plans to sell them online, where their prices have reached as high as $4,000 a doll.

Unbeknownst to them, Osama bin Laden and his group of Al-Qaeda terrorists, who had been secretly hiding in Paradise since the 9/11 attacks, under the watchful eye of bin Laden's best friend President George W. Bush, are after the same shipment, but for entirely different reasons. Hoping to outdo the catastrophe of 9/11, they plan to instill the dolls with Avian influenza and distribute them to unsuspecting American children. The two groups meet at the shipment's destination, German-themed amusement park called Little Germany. A fight between Postal creator Vince Desi and Postal director and park owner Uwe Boll (which ends with Boll being shot in the genitals, confessing "I hate video games"), sparks a massive shootout between the cult, the terrorists and the police, resulting in the deaths of dozens of innocent children. The Dude and the cult are able to get away with both the shipment and the park's opening day guest, Verne Troyer, pursued by Al-Qaeda, the police and a mob of angry citizens.

Upon returning to their compound, which has been overtaken by the terrorists, the Dude, Uncle Dave and the rest covertly sneak into the compound's underground bunker, where Richie reveals that he must now fulfill the prophecy foretold in Uncle Dave's fictional Bible: to bring about the extinction of the human race. As per Uncle Dave's Bible, the event initiating the apocalypse is the rape of a "tiny entertainer" by a thousand monkeys. After Verne Troyer is quickly thrown into a pit of chimpanzees, Richie shoots and kills Uncle Dave, then imprisons the Dude. The Dude manages to escape the compound with a plethora of weapons, deciding to wage a one-man war against al-Qaeda, his uncle's murderer, his cheating wife, the police and the many people who want him dead. On the way to his trailer (where he plans to blow up his spouse), he meets up with an attractive young barista, Faith, who joins forces with him after an explosive gunfight followed later by the Dude's heartfelt but futile monologue about war. The two of them then proceed to kill all the terrorists, all the bloodthirsty townspeople, the remains of the now-mad cult, his wife, and her multiple lovers. In the midst of the shootout, bin Laden is wounded but escapes to a payphone, where he calls Bush for help. Bush sends a helicopter to save him and plans for the two to rendezvous.

Having won their war, the Dude, his dog Champ and the barista drive away in a stolen police car. They casually turn on the radio, only to learn that Bush has blamed the day's shootouts and explosions on China and India, and has been "forced to destroy both countries with extreme nuclear force". The United States then launches thirty nuclear missiles at China and India each. In retaliation, China and India launch thirty nuclear missiles each as well towards America, all missiles are scheduled to hit their targets in under two minutes.

The film's final shot features Bush and bin Laden skipping through a field together, hand-in-hand. As mushroom clouds explode on the horizon, bin Laden laughs and says, "Georgie, I think this is the beginning of a beautiful friendship". At that moment, all of the nuclear missiles hit, and the country, and possibly the world is destroyed.

Cast

Production
According to Uwe Boll, the German fan club for Postal contacted him, offering the possibility of the game being adapted into a film. Intrigued by the game's premise and blatant political incorrectness, Boll contacted Running with Scissors president Vince Desiderio, who sold him the rights under the condition that he would be involved with the script and the production. Supposedly, Desiderio and Postal 2 director Steve Wik pitched a much grittier, darker version of the Postal story, but Boll rejected it, fully intent on turning it into a comedy in order to use the film as a platform for political satire as well as "revenge" against the people who have protested his movies. Boll ended up writing the script with assistant director Bryan C. Knight, who had worked on all of Boll's previous video game adaptations. In an interview for Nathan Rabin's book My Year of Flops, Dave Foley said that Boll did want to make a serious statement about how a cult of heroism had surrounded people who were murdered in the 9/11 attacks, and that he and Boll agreed that being the victim of terrorism makes people victims, not heroes. Foley added that he tried to talk Boll out of including the notorious 9/11 sequence that opens the film where two Al Qaeda hijackers plan to call off their attack when Osama Bin Laden informs them that they will not receive anywhere near 72 virgins for their services, only to have passengers break into the cockpit and accidentally fly the plane into the World Trade Center because the film would have no chance of appearing on many (or any) screens in the U.S.

Postal filmed from September 13 – October 30, 2006 in Cloverdale and Vancouver, British Columbia, Canada.

Release

Box office

Worldwide
The 114-minute director's cut of Postal premiered at Montreal's Fantasia Festival on July 21, 2007. The film made its way along several more United States and European film festivals until finally receiving a limited release in Germany on October 18. It opened at #27 in the German box office, taking in $79,353 from 48 screens and banked $142,761 in its entire run. In Italy, it ended its box office run after two weeks with $3,980. As of August 31, 2008, it has grossed a total of $146,741 worldwide.

North America
Despite Boll's announcement that Postal would be given a wide release on October 12, 2007, it was delayed until May 23, 2008. Additionally, on 16 May, theater distributors pulled out of their deal for a wide release of 1,500 screens to a limited release of only four screens. Said Boll of the change, "Theatrical distributors are boycotting Postal because of its political content. We were prepared to open on 1,500 screens all across America on May 23rd. Any multiplex in the U.S. should have space for us, but they're afraid... We have even tried to buy a few screens in New York City and Los Angeles, and they won't let us even rent the theaters! I urge independent exhibitors to contact us and book 'Postal'! Audiences have been expecting the film and I don't think exhibitors should censor what gets played in U.S. theaters."

On May 20, the screen count increased to 12 screens. By release, it had grown to 21.

Postal opened one day after Indiana Jones and the Kingdom of the Crystal Skull, which led to video promotions from Boll, jokingly claiming that his film would "destroy" the other film at the box office. A number of Internet promos were made featuring Troyer dressed as Indiana Jones, proclaiming Postal superiority.

Home media

Postal received its North American DVD release on August 26, 2008, in both 102-minute unrated and 100-minute rated versions, as well as a 102-minute unrated Blu-ray release. Both versions feature the film's trailer, a promotional spot featuring Verne Troyer's Indiana Jones, a featurette detailing the filming of the Little Germany scene, footage of Boll's infamous "Raging Boll" boxing matches and an audio commentary by Boll. Some editions come with the full version of Postal 2 (Share the Pain edition) on a bonus disc.

The 118-minute director's cut was released on September 26, 2008, in Germany. It was planned for a North American release on Blu-ray for November 25, 2008, and on DVD for January 6, 2009, but both of these releases were delayed indefinitely. The director's cut is cropped from the original 1.85:1 aspect ratio into 2.35:1.

The film has also been released in Australia as an 89-minute cut with no special features, bearing an MA15+ rating.

Critical reception
The site's critics consensus reads: "An attempt at political satire that lacks any wit or relevance, Postal is nonetheless one of Uwe Boll's more successful films -- for what it's worth." Metacritic assigned the film a weighted average score of 22 out of 100, based on 11 critics, indicating "generally unfavorable reviews".

Jeremy Knox of Film Threat gave the film 3 out of 5 stars and stated, "It's such an insanely fun ride that most of its flaws are forgivable." Peter Hartlaub of San Francisco Chronicle gave the film 2.5 out of 5 stars and stated, "Not only less than horrible, but actually occasionally enjoyable." Nathan Rabin of AV Club gave the film 2 out of 5 stars and stated, "A provocation first, an insult second, a publicity stunt third, and a film a distant fourth." Dennis Harvey of Variety gave the film 2 out of 5 stars and stated, "This anything-goes exercise isn't dull -- one just wishes the outrageousness were more consistently funny."

Maitland McDonagh of TV Guide gave the film 2 out of 5 stars and stated, "Postal's touches of wit are lost in the flying body parts, gross-out gags, and the full frontal spectacle of Foley's no-longer-private parts." Michael Harris of The Globe And Mail gave the film 1 star out of 5 and stated, "What Boll gives us is a boring beating over the head." Kyle Smith of New York Post gave the film 1 out of 5 stars and stated, "At last: Uwe Boll has made his first intentionally funny film." Aaron Hillis of The Village Voice gave the film 1 out of 5 stars and stated, "Manages to be as toothless as he (Boll) is tasteless. Poorly framed, tone-deaf, and nonsensical (yet still Boll's best!)" Nathan Lee of The New York Times gave the film 0.5 out of 5 stars and stated, "Infantile, irreverent and boorish to the max, Postal explodes with bad attitude and lousy filmmaking." Elizabeth Weitzman of Daily News gave the film 0 out of 5 stars and stated, "Where Boll's movies were once amusingly atrocious, Postal is so aggressively tasteless and knowingly idiotic, there's just no fun to be had."

Accolades
The film was nominated for three Golden Raspberry Awards: Worst Supporting Actor (Boll as himself), Worst Supporting Actor (Troyer as himself), and Worst Director (Boll). The film ended up winning Worst Director.

Despite critical condemnation, Postal won two awards at the Hoboken International Film Festival: Best Director and the festival's top prize, Best of Festival.

Cancelled sequel
Boll stated shortly after the film's production that he would most likely make a Postal 2, even if it went direct-to-video. In a 2012 interview, Vince Desi commented that they "are in talks at present regarding another movie". On August 28, 2013, Boll announced he was funding production of Postal 2 through Kickstarter. The project was canceled on October 5 due to lack of funding.

See also
 List of films based on video games

References

External links
 
 
 
 
 

2000s American films
2000s Canadian films
2000s English-language films
2000s satirical films
2007 action comedy films
2007 comedy films
2007 films
American action comedy films
American satirical films
Canadian action comedy films
Canadian satirical films
Cultural depictions of George W. Bush
Cultural depictions of Osama bin Laden
English-language Canadian films
English-language German films
Films about nuclear war and weapons
Films based on the September 11 attacks
Films directed by Uwe Boll
Films set in Paradise, Arizona
Films shot in Vancouver
German action comedy films
Golden Raspberry Award winning films
Live-action films based on video games
Postal (franchise)
2000s German films